Drapetis is a genus of flies belonging to the family Hybotidae.

The genus has cosmopolitan distribution.

Species:
 Drapetis abbreviata Smith, 1962 
 Drapetis abdominenotata Senior-White, 1922

References

Hybotidae